Kalateh-ye Sufizadeh (also Romanized as Kalāteh-ye Şūfīzādeh) is a village in Shirin Su Rural District, Maneh District, Maneh and Samalqan County, North Khorasan Province, Iran. At the 2006 census, its population was 28, in 4 families.

References 

Populated places in Maneh and Samalqan County